Alamdan-e Sofla (also Romanized as ‘Alamdān-e Soflā; also known as ‘Alamdān and Alamdār) is a village in Dezh Gah Rural District, Dehram District, Farashband County, Fars Province, Iran. At the 2006 census, its population was 168, in 40 families.

References 

Populated places in Farashband County